Alvin Cassel (25 February 1914 – 8 August 2000) was an American lawyer in South Florida who cofounded the firm  Broad and Cassel.  A native of Miami, Florida  he attended the University of Florida as an undergraduate where he was a member of the Pi Lambda Phi fraternity. He died in Miami in August 2000, at the age of 86.

References

External links

Florida lawyers
2000 deaths
1914 births
Lawyers from New York City
20th-century American lawyers